Molashiyeh may refer to:
 Molashiyeh 1
 Molashiyeh 3